Cronus Airlines was a Greek airline based in Athens. It operated
scheduled as well as chartered flights using a fleet of Boeing 737-300 & 400 aircraft.

History
Cronus Airlines was established in 1994 by Ret. Air Force fighter pilot Captain Theodore Kokmotos, started operation in 1995 with a single aircraft that flew flights targeting expat
traffic between Greece and Germany as well as chartered flights to popular tourist
destinations. Two years later, Cronus leased more aircraft and expanded its network,
gradually becoming the largest privately owned airline in Greece. In late December 1998,
the Laskaridis family who own a large fleet of refrigerator ships, acquired
a controlling 55% stake in Cronus. In spring 2001, a code-share agreement was signed with
Aegean Airlines and a few months later Cronus' aircraft were painted in Aegean's livery
carrying an AEGEANCronus logo. Eventually, Cronus was fully acquired by Aegean in October
2001 and its owners obtained a minority share in Aegean.

Destinations
Cronus Airlines operated scheduled services from/to the following cities:
Athens, Thessaloniki, Heraklion, Chania, Rhodes, Kavala and Alexandroupolis.
International destinations:
London, Paris, Rome, Munich, Frankfurt, Stuttgart, Cologne and Düsseldorf.

In general terms, flights to London, Paris and Rome were operated from Athens, while those to Germany were mostly continuations of the domestic flights to Salonica, therefore passengers from Athens to German destinations would fly to Salonica and then remain on the same plane for the leg to Germany. There were also flights between Stuttgart and Kavala.

See also
Aegean Airlines

References

External links

Cronus Airlines history from Airliners.gr
Cronus Airlines fleet
Cronus Airlines aircraft photos from Airliners.net

Defunct airlines of Greece
Airlines established in 1994
Airlines disestablished in 2001
2001 disestablishments in Greece
Greek companies established in 1994